Ihazoara is a town and commune in Madagascar. It belongs to the district of Vohibato, which is a part of Haute Matsiatra Region. The population of the commune was estimated to be 7376 in 2018.

Primary and junior level secondary education are available in town. The majority 99.3% of the population of the commune are farmers.  The most important crop is rice. Other important products include beans, cassava and sweet potatoes. Services provide employment for 0.7% of the population.

References and notes 

Populated places in Haute Matsiatra